Norbert N. Sacksteder  (September 25, 1895 – June 19, 1986) was a professional football player during the early years of the National Football League with the Dayton Triangles, Detroit Heralds, Detroit Tigers and the Canton Bulldogs. Sacksteder was a part of the Bulldogs' 1922 NFL championship team. He was considered one of the greatest breakaway runners of his time.

College
Before he joined the NFL, Sacksteder was a basketball standout at the University of Dayton, then called St. Marys Institute. In the fall of 1913, Norb helped form a football team under the school's name, the St. Marys Cadets. The team's first year posted a 7-0 record. St. Mary's then won the Dayton city championship and then defeated the Cincinnati Celts 27-0 at Redland Park in Cincinnati.

Professional football
After college, Sacksteder played exclusively for the Dayton Triangles. In 1917 though he played for the Detroit Heralds. In 1917, at the outbreak of American's involvement in World War I, he joined the United States Army. In 1918 Norb, under coach Greasy Neale, defeated the Hammond Pros 23-0 in Sacksteder's only known game that season. He may have been on leave from the service or perhaps simply retired for the remainder of the season.

The Triangles would later become a founder of the NFL, then called the American Professional Football Association. On October 3, 1920, The Triangles defeated the Columbus Panhandles 14-0 at Triangle Park in the first game between two NFL teams. Norb was in the line-up for Dayton during that historic game.

Notes

References
Dayton Played a Role in the Founding of the NFL
A War Year: 1918
Let's Play Two: 1913

1895 births
Players of American football from Dayton, Ohio
Canton Bulldogs players
Dayton Triangles players
Dayton Triangles (Ohio League) players
Detroit Heralds players
Detroit Tigers (NFL) players
Dayton Flyers football players
1986 deaths